is a Japanese footballer currently playing as a defensive midfielder for Kawasaki Frontale.

Club career
In 2021, while studying at the Hosei University, Matsui was approved to be a designated special player for Kawasaki Frontale for the rest of the season, having agreed to join the club in 2022, when he graduated.

Personal life
Renji is the brother of Japanese model and actress Airi Matsui.

Career statistics

Club
:

Notes

References

2000 births
Living people
Association football people from Fukushima Prefecture
Hosei University alumni
Japanese footballers
Japan youth international footballers
Association football midfielders
Kawasaki Frontale players